The Calvin Knights are the Calvin University athletics teams. Calvin University fields are ten men's and eleven women's varsity intercollegiate teams that participate in the Michigan Intercollegiate Athletic Association at the National Collegiate Athletic Association Division III level.

History of the name
Between 1920–21 and 1926–27, the school's athletic teams were known as the "Calvin-ites. The first reference to the "Calvin Knights" appeared in 1926–27.

Teams
There are currently both men's and women's varsity athletic teams participating in basketball, cross country, golf, lacrosse, soccer, swimming, diving, tennis, and track and field.  In addition, there is a men's varsity baseball team and women's varsity softball and volleyball teams.

Calvin also fields an American Collegiate Hockey Association men's ice hockey team.

Athletic facilities
The Spoelhof Fieldhouse Complex is home to the combined health, physical education, recreation, dance and sport department.  In Spring 2007, the college began a $50 million construction project to renovate and expand the Calvin Fieldhouse.  The fieldhouse reopened in Spring 2009 as the Spoelhof Fieldhouse Complex. The  facility includes a new 5,000 seat arena (Van Noord Arena) which is currently the largest arena in a Division III school, an Olympic-regulation swimming pool (Venema Aquatic Center) which seats about 550, a tennis and track center (Huizenga Tennis and Track Center) containing 4 tennis courts and a 200-meter track,  of weight training rooms and a custom made rock climbing wall. The Hoogenboom Health and Recreation Center contains the original renovated gym that is now used for basketball, volleyball, PE classes, intramurals, and many concerts.  The Hoogenboom Center also has two dance studios as well as racquetball courts and exercise science laboratories.

Calvin–Hope rivalry

In 2005, ESPN polled its staff about what they thought were the nation's greatest college basketball rivalries, and the Calvin–Hope rivalry was voted fourth in all college basketball.

Championships
Calvin has won 11 NCAA Division III national championships and one club sport (ACHA Division III) national championship.

References

External links